The Met: Policing London is a British documentary television series about the Metropolitan Police Service.  it is being broadcast on BBC One. The series shows how the Met works from Bernard Hogan-Howe, and later Cressida Dick, the Commissioner of Police of the Metropolis, to police officers. The Met is produced by BBC Documentaries who have previously made Our War, an award-winning series about British soldiers in Afghanistan, and Protecting Our Children, about social services.

The first series, comprising five episodes, began broadcasting on BBC One on Monday 8 June 2015.

The documentary was renewed for a second series, which finished filming in March 2017. The second series – which also comprises five episodes – premiered on 24 May 2017.

The third series first aired on 3 October 2019, and runs for 7 episodes.

Production
Charlotte Moore, the controller of BBC One, announced the series on 23 October 2013. She called it the "first ever definitive portrait of the Met" and said documentaries like The Met were "at the heart of BBC One's remit". The series will be made by BBC Documentaries and will consist of six, hour-long episodes.

Bernard Hogan-Howe, the head of London's Metropolitan Police Service, said he was delighted to be working with the BBC and also said:I hope that over the coming months, we can reveal the true scale and complexity of the challenges faced by officers and staff across the service as they meet the demands of modern policing—and at a time when we are going through a period of unprecedented change. I am proud of the Met. I hope this documentary helps the people of London learn more about policing and be proud of us too. The series was commissioned by Charlotte Moore and Emma Willis, the head of documentary commissioning for the BBC. The executive producer for the series is Aysha Rafaele, the head of documentaries for the BBC.

References

External links

2015 British television series debuts
BBC high definition shows
Television shows set in London
BBC television documentaries
English-language television shows